Ian George Peck (born 18 October 1957) is a former English cricketer. Peck was a right-handed batsman who fielded as a wicket-keeper. He was born in Great Staughton, Huntingdonshire, and educated at Bedford School.

Peck made his debut in county cricket for Bedfordshire in the 1976 Minor Counties Championship against Buckinghamshire. The following season he made his List A debut for the county against Northumberland in the 1977 Gillette Cup. Continuing to play Minor counties cricket for Bedfordshire, Peck later attended Magdalene College, Cambridge, making his first-class debut in 1978 for Cambridge University Cricket Club against Essex. He played first-class cricket for Cambridge University from 1978 to 1981, making 22 appearances, and captaining the university team in 1980 and 1981. During this period he also made seven List A appearances for the Combined Universities spread over the 1980 and 1981 Benson & Hedges Cups. In these matches, he scored 97 runs at an average of 32.33, with a high score of 31. During this period he also made a single first-class appearance for a combined Oxford and Cambridge Universities against the touring Sri Lankans, as well as making two first-class appearances for Northamptonshire, making an appearance each in the 1980 County Championship against Somerset and in the 1981 County Championship against Yorkshire.

In 1984, Peck undertook studies once more at Cambridge University, making four further first-class appearances for the university in that season. In total, he made 26 first-class appearance for Cambridge University, scoring 483 runs at an average of 14.20, with a high score of 49 not out. Behind the stumps he took 11 catches. He played Minor counties cricket for Bedfordshire until 1985, by which time he had made 33 Minor Counties Championship appearances and two MCCA Knockout Trophy appearances. He made a final List A appearance for Bedfordshire in the 1985 NatWest Trophy against Gloucestershire. In this match he captained Bedfordshire, scoring a single run before being dismissed by Kevin Curran, with Gloucestershire winning by 141 runs.

Peck was also a Cambridge blue at rugby union, captaining Cambridge University R.U.F.C. in the 1979 season, and came close to playing for the England national rugby union team as a member of the squad during the 1980 Five Nations Championship.

After he left Cambridge, Peck taught at his old school, Bedford School.

References

External links

1957 births
Living people
Alumni of Magdalene College, Cambridge
Bedfordshire cricket captains
British Universities cricketers
Cambridge University cricketers
Cambridge University R.U.F.C. players
English cricketers
English rugby union players
Northamptonshire cricketers
Oxford and Cambridge Universities cricketers
People educated at Bedford School
People from Great Staughton
Rugby union players from Cambridgeshire
Rugby union scrum-halves
Wicket-keepers